Otto II of Scheyern (some authors call him Otto III) (died 31 October 1120) was a son of Otto I, Count of Scheyern.  His mother can not be unambiguously assigned because Otto I was married with a daughter of Count Meginhardt of Reichersbeuern and later with Haziga of Diessen (the widow of Count Herman of Kastl) and we don't know when Otto was born.

Life 
He was Vogt of Freising and from 1116 also Vogt of Weihenstephan.

Marriage and issue 
Otto II may have been married to Richardis, the daughter of Ulric I, Margrave of Carniola.  They had four children:
 Otto III (d. after 15 December 1130)
 Eckhard III (d. after 11 July 1183)
 Bernard II (d. )
 unnamed son

External links 
 Family tree of the Counts of Scheyern-Wittelsbach-Dachau-Valley, from a lecture by Prof. Schmid: Bayern im Spätmittelalter, winter 1996/97
 Otto II at genealogie-mittelalter (give a different date of death)
 Otto III at genealogie-mittelalter

House of Wittelsbach
Counts of Germany
11th-century births
1120 deaths
Year of birth unknown
11th-century German nobility
12th-century German nobility